Kirnach is a river of Bavaria, Germany. It is a tributary of the Wertach in Ebenhofen.

See also
List of rivers of Bavaria

References

Rivers of Bavaria
Rivers of Germany